The Avinagillan standing stone is a prehistoric menhir on the Kintyre Peninsula of Scotland. The stone is near the hamlet of Avinagillan.

See also
 Kilbrannan Sound

Line notes

References
 Megalithic Portal Avinagillan standing stone

Megalithic monuments in Scotland
History of Argyll and Bute
Stone Age Scotland
Kintyre